André Plourde (born 12 January 1937 in Rivière-du-Loup, Quebec) was a Progressive Conservative member of the House of Commons of Canada. He was a businessman and industrialist by career.

He represented the Quebec riding of Kamouraska—Rivière-du-Loup where he was first elected in the 1984 federal election and re-elected in 1988, therefore becoming a member in the 33rd and 34th Canadian Parliaments.

Plourde was defeated by Paul Crête of the Bloc Québécois in the 1993 federal election, ending his federal political service. He made another unsuccessful attempt to return to Parliament in the 1997 federal election at the Kamouraska—Rivière-du-Loup—Témiscouata—Les Basques riding.

External links
 

1937 births
Living people
Members of the House of Commons of Canada from Quebec
People from Rivière-du-Loup
Progressive Conservative Party of Canada MPs